Peggy Creek is a stream in the U.S. state of South Dakota.

Peggy Creek has the name of a horse which roamed the area.

See also
List of rivers of South Dakota

References

Rivers of Harding County, South Dakota
Rivers of Perkins County, South Dakota
Rivers of South Dakota